Pieter Hendrik van Cittert (30 May 1889, Gouda – 8 October 1959, Utrecht) was a Dutch physicist and science historian. He was born in Gouda, Netherlands, to Benjamin Pieter van Cittert and Petronella Antonia Huber, and died on October 8, 1959, in Utrecht. His achievements include proving the van Cittert–Zernike theorem about the coherence of radiation and founding the University Museum in Utrecht.

Career
In 1912, Hendrik van Cittert joined the Physics Laboratory at the University of Utrecht. In 1918, he discovered thousands of historical scientific instruments from the eighteenth-century Physics Society in Utrecht. This collection was the starting point for the University Museum, which Hendrik van Cittert founded in 1928. He was promoted in 1919.

In 1921, Hendrik van Cittert and Leonard Ornstein were among the founders of the Dutch Physical Society (NNV). Hendrik van Cittert was a part-time teacher of physics at HOBS in Utrecht (1916–1950). He founded the Physics Laboratory in Utrecht (1922–1950) and became the first director of the University Museum of Utrecht (1951–1955).

Personal life
Van Cittert married his colleague, the physicist Johanna Geertruida van Cittert-Eymers in 1938.

References

1889 births
1959 deaths
20th-century Dutch physicists
Historians of science
Academic staff of Utrecht University
People from Gouda, South Holland